Patricia Harty may refer to:
 Patricia Harty (journalist)
 Patricia Harty (actress)